William Joseph Foley (20 June 1931 in Nedlands, Western Australia – 10 February 1991 in Perth), an Australian metropolitan bishop, was the seventh Roman Catholic Archbishop of the Archdiocese of Perth, Western Australia, serving from 1983 until his death in 1991. Prior to his election as Archbishop, Foley served as Bishop of Geraldton from 1981 until 1983.

Early career
Educated by the Christian Brothers at Christian Brothers' College, Perth, Foley was ordained at priest by Archbishop Goody in 1954, aged 23 years.

Archbishop of Perth
Foley served as the fourth archbishop of Perth from 1983 to 1991.

Honours
A portrait of the late Archbishop hangs in Foley Hall in The University of Notre Dame, Perth campus, named in his honour in 1993. Foley's family have also established a prize, called the Foley Award in memory of the late Archbishop, given to a student who has made an outstanding contribution to service and to Notre Dame University.

A retirement village in the Perth suburb of Hilton is named in honour of Foley; as well as the Foley Centre, a gymnasium complex at Trinity College, Perth.

References

Further reading

External links

1931 births
1991 deaths
Roman Catholic archbishops of Perth
People educated at Christian Brothers' College, Perth
20th-century Roman Catholic archbishops in Australia
Roman Catholic bishops of Geraldton